Macedonia in the Middle Ages may refer to:

 Medieval history of Macedonia (region), medieval period in the history of the region of Macedonia
 Medieval history of Macedonia (Greece), medieval period in the history of Greek Macedonia
 Medieval history of North Macedonia, medieval period in the history of modern North Macedonia
 Macedonia (theme), a theme (Byzantine province) located in the region of Thrace

See also
 Macedonia (disambiguation)